is a city located in Niigata Prefecture, Japan. , the city had an estimated population of 48,458 in 188703 households, and a population density of 138 persons per km².

Geography
Gosen is located in an inland region of north-central Niigata Prefecture. The Agano River flows through the city.

Surrounding municipalities
Niigata Prefecture
Akiha-ku, Niigata
Agano
Sanjō
Kamo
Aga
Tagami

History

The area of present-day Gosen was part of ancient Echigo Province. Under the Tokugawa shogunate of Edo period Japan, parts of what is now Gosen were under the control of Muramatsu Domain, a minor   feudal domain ruled by a junior branch of the Hori clan.

Municipal timeline
 On April 1, 1889 - the town of Gosen was created within Kitakanbara District, Niigata with the establishment of the modern municipalities system.
 On November 3, 1954 - the modern city of Gosen was established from the merger of the town of Gosen with the villages of Sumoto, Kawahigashi and Hashida (all from Kitakanbara District).
 On January 1, 2006 - the town of Muramatsu (from Nakakanbara District) was merged into Gosen.

Climate
Gosen has a humid climate (Köppen Cfa) characterized by warm, wet summers and cold winters with heavy snowfall.  The average annual temperature in Gosen is 13.1 °C. The average annual rainfall is 1886 mm with September as the wettest month.The temperatures are highest on average in August, at around 26.2 °C, and lowest in January, at around1.3 °C.

Demographics
Per Japanese census data, the population of Gosen has declined steadily over the past 40 years.

Government

Gosen has a mayor-council form of government with a directly elected mayor and a unicameral city legislature of 20 members.

Economy
The economy of Gosen is primarily agricultural, with production of cut flowers, peonies, satoimo and kiwi fruit as important crops.

Education
Gosen has eleven public elementary schools and four public junior high schools operated by the city government. There are two public high schools operated by the Niigata Prefectural Board of Education in the city. The prefecture also operates one special education school.<fref>Gosen Prefectural Special Education School home page</ref> Niigata University's Department of Agriculture has a field test farm in Gosen.

Transportation

Railway
 JR East - Banetsu West Line
  -  -  -  -

Highway
  – Gosen PA

Local attractions

Notable people from Gosen
Yoshifumi Kondō (anime director, character designer)
Kazuya Tsurumaki (anime director)
Kimio Yanagisawa (manga artist)

References

External links

Official Website 
English page

 
Cities in Niigata Prefecture